Campodea navasi is a species of two-pronged bristletail in the family Campodeidae.

References

Further reading

 
 
 
 
 
 
 
 

Diplura
Animals described in 1932